Tylopilus cyanescens is a bolete fungus found in New South Wales, Australia, where it grows on sandy soils in eucalypt forest. It was described as new to science in 1999 by mycologists Roy Watling and Tai-Hui Li.

References

External links

cyanescens
Fungi described in 1999
Fungi of Australia
Taxa named by Roy Watling